Mateo is a masculine given name, a form of Matthew used in Spanish and Croatian, similar to the Italian form Matteo. Mateo was among the five most popular names for Hispanic newborn boys in the American state of Virginia in 2022. Notable people with the name include:

 Master Mateo (c. 1150–c. 1200/1217), sculptor and architect who worked in the Iberian Peninsula
 Mateo Aimerich (1715–1799), Spanish philologist
 Mateo Alemán (1547–1615?), Spanish novelist and writer
 Mateo Bertoša (born 1988), Croatian footballer 
 Mateo Cañellas (born 1972), Spanish middle distance runner and politician, known as Mateu Cañellas
 Mateo A. T. Caparas (1923–2020), Filipino lawyer
 Mateo Cassierra (born 1997), Colombian football striker
 Mateo Castellano (born 1996), Argentine football midfielder
 Mateo Chiarino, Uruguayan actor and writer 
 Mateo Corbo (born 1976), Uruguayan footballer 
 Mateo Correa Magallanes (1866–1927), Mexican Roman Catholic priest and martyr 
 Mateo de Angulo (born 1990), Colombian swimmer
 Mateo de Toro Zambrano, 1st Count of La Conquista (1727–1811), Royal Governor of Chile
 Mateo de Sagade de Bugueyro (1605–1672), Spanish Roman Catholic prelate
 Mateo Delmastro (born 2000), Argentine badminton player
 Mateo Elías Nieves Castillo (1882–1928), Mexican Roman Catholic priest
 Mateo Flecha el Joven (c. 1530–1604), Spanish composer
 Mateo Flecha (1481–1553), composer born in Kingdom of Aragon
 Mateo Flores (1922–2011), Guatemalan long-distance runner
 Mateo Frazier (born 1977), American writer, director, and producer
 Mateo García (born 1996), Argentine footballer
 Mateo Gil (born 1972), Spanish film director, screenwriter, and cinematographer
 Mateo Gil (conquistador), Spanish conquistador, Alcalde and Regidor of Santa Fe, Argentina during the Viceroyalty of Peru
 Mateo González Manrique, Spanish soldier and colonial governor of West Florida between 1813 and 1815
 Mateo Gucci (c. 1500 – c. 1550), Polish-Italian Renaissance architect and sculptor
 Mateo Guez, French-Canadian director, writer, photographer and producer
 Mateo Hasa (born 1993), Albanian football player
 Mateo Hrvatin (born 1980), Croatian handballer
 Mateo Jover, Bronze Wolf Award recipient
 Mateo Leal de Ayala (1560–1627), Spanish noblemen, mayor, and governor
 Mateo Malupo (born 1988), Tongan rugby union player
 José Manuel Mateo (born 1975), Spanish football defender
 Mateo Martinic (born 1931), Chilean historian, politician and lawyer
 Matéo Maximoff (1917–1999), French writer and Evangelical pastor of Romani ethnicity
 Mateo Messina (born 1972), American composer
 Mateo Míguez Adán (born 1987), Spanish footballer
 Matéo Mornar (born 1946), French sculptor of contemporary art
 Mateo Morrison (born 1946), Dominican writer, lawyer, poet and essayist
 Mateo Musacchio (born 1990), Argentine professional footballer
 Mateo Pavlović (born 1990), Croatian football defender
 Mateo Pinello (died 1569), Roman Catholic prelate who served as Bishop of Cuzco (1565–1569)
 Mateo Poljak (born 1989), Croatian footballer
 Mateo Pumacahua (1740–1815), Peruvian revolutionary
 Mateo Qares, Tanzanian politician, cabinet minister and member of Parliament for Babati constituency
 Mateo Restrepo (born 1997), Canadian soccer player
Mateo Romero (artist) (born 1966), Native American painter
Mateo Romero (composer) (c. 1575–1647), Belgian-born Spanish composer of Baroque music
 Mateo Rosas de Oquendo (c. 1559–1612), Peruvian satirist
 Mateo Roskam (born 1987), Croatian footballer
 Mateo Sanguinetti (born 1992), Uruguayan rugby union player
 Mateo Sanz Lanz (born 1993), Swiss sailor
 Mateo Silić (born 1984), Croatian footballer
 Mateo Sušić (born 1990), Bosnian football midfielder
 Mateo Túnez (born 1989), Spanish motorcycle road racer
 Mateo Vidal (1780–1855), Uruguayan priest and politician
 Mateo Zefi (born 1994), Albanian football player

Fictional characters
Mateo Santos, on All My Children
Mateo Solano Villanueva, on The CW's Jane the Virgin

See also
Matea
Mateo (disambiguation)
 Mateo (surname)

References

Spanish masculine given names
Croatian masculine given names